Barnim V (1369–1402/1403) was one of the Dukes of Pomerania. He was the son of Bogislaw V. He ruled over parts of Pomerania-Stolp; first the territories near Stargard Szczeciński, and in his last years, 1402–1403, he co-ruled Pomerania-Stolp with his brother, Bogislaw VIII.

Sources on the exact date of his death vary, he died in 1402 (16 May) or early 1403 (13 February).

He married a Lithuanian princess, one of the relatives of Vytautas; they had no children.

Ancestors 

Dukes of Pomerania
1369 births
1403 deaths